At least three ships of the Brazilian Navy have borne the name Santa Catharina or Santa Catarina

 , a  launched in 1868 and sunk in 1882
 , a  launched in 1909 and stricken in 1944
  a  launched in 1943 as USS Irwin, acquired by Brazil in 1968 and expended as a target in 1990

Brazilian Navy ship names